Kamehime (27 July 1560 – 1 August 1625) was a Japanese woman from the Sengoku period. She was the eldest daughter of Tokugawa Ieyasu with his first wife, Lady Tsukiyama. 

She married Okudaira Nobumasa. The marriage was arranged as a reward for Nobumasa, who had proven himself as the guardian of Nagashino Castle. It is said that her dowry included one of the twenty-one prized writing boxes crafted by Koami masters. She is known to have acted actively in the siege of Nagashino. Kamehime helped her husband and send Torii Suneemon on the mission to cross the enemy army to request aid to her father, Ieyasu in Okazaki and defended the Nagashino castle. 

After Ieyasu's death she had a large part in the overthrow of Honda Masazumi, whom she disliked.

In 1625, Kamehime died at age 66. Her Buddhist name was Seitokuin and her remains were buried in Kokoku-ji Temple.

Family 
 Father: Tokugawa Ieyasu
 Mother: Lady Tsukiyama
 Husband: Okudaira Nobumasa
 Children:
 Okudaira Iemasa (1577–1614) of Utsunomiya Domain.
 Matsudaira Ieharu (1579–1592).
 Matsudaira Tadaaki 
 Okudaira Tadamasa
 Daughter married Okubo Tadatsune of Kisai Domain.

Legacy 
Since April 2008, Kamehime has been characterized as a navigator for a municipal administration program produced in Shinshiro City, Aichi Prefecture. The street in front of Kokoku-ji Temple, where her grave is located, has been maintained as "Kamehime-dori" following the redevelopment work in front of Shinshiro Station.

References

1560 births
1625 deaths
People of Edo-period Japan
16th-century Japanese people
Japanese women in warfare
Women in 16th-century warfare
Women of medieval Japan
16th-century Japanese women
Tokugawa clan